Network, networking and networked may refer to:

Science and technology
 Network theory, the study of graphs as a representation of relations between discrete objects
 Network science, an academic field that studies complex networks

Mathematics
 Networks, a graph with attributes studied in network theory 
 Scale-free network, a network whose degree distribution follows a power law
 Small-world network, a mathematical graph in which most nodes are not neighbors, but have neighbors in common
 Flow network, a directed graph where each edge has a capacity and each edge receives a flow

Biology
 Biological network, any network that applies to biological systems
 Ecological network, a representation of interacting species in an ecosystem
 Neural network, a network or circuit of neurons

Technology and communication
 Artificial neural network, a computing system inspired by animal brains
 Broadcast network, radio stations, television stations, or other electronic media outlets that broadcast content from a centralized source
 News network
 Radio network, including both broadcast and two-way communications
 Television network, used to distribute television program content
 Electrical network, an interconnection of electrical components
 Social networking service, an online platform that people use to build social networks
 Telecommunications network, allowing communication between separated nodes
 Computer network or data network, a digital telecommunications network
 Network hardware: Network switch, Ethernet cables
 Wireless network, a computer network using wireless data connections
 Network (typeface), used on the transport network in the West Midlands, UK

Sociology and business
 Social network, in social science research
 Scientific collaboration network, a social network wherein nodes are scientists and links are co-authorships
 Social group, a network of people
 Network of practice, a social science concept
 Business networking, the sharing of information or services between people, businesses or groups
 Supply network, a pattern of temporal and spatial processes carried out at facility nodes and over distribution links
 Transport network, a network in geographic space

Arts, entertainment and media

 Network (1976 film), a 1976 American film
 Network (2019 film), an Indian film
 Network (album), a 2004 album by Saga
 Network (comics), a series of Marvel Comics characters
 Network (play), a 2017 play based on the 1976 film
 Network (TV series), a Canadian variety television series
 Network (video game), a 1980 business simulation game for the Apple II
 Network, aka Taryn Haldane, a fictional character and member of the Sovereign Seven comic book series
 Network, the members' newsletter of the British Sociological Association
 The Network, an American new wave band
 "The Network", a 1987 Matlock episode
 The Network, a fictional organization in the comic strip Modesty Blaise
 "Networking", a song by We Are the Physics from We Are the Physics Are OK at Music

Organizations
 NETWORK (Slovak party), a political party in Slovakia
 Network (lobby group), an American social justice group
 The Network (political party), an Italian political party (1991–1999)
 The Network (professional wrestling), a professional wrestling stable
 The Network 2018, an Italian political party (2011–present)
 Network (Russia), allegedly an anti-government anarchist organization active in Russia in 2015–2017

See also
 List of university networks
 Nettwerk, Nettwerk Music Group, a record label
 Netzwerk (disambiguation)
 Networked: The New Social Operating System, a 2012 book